Lamb Chop's Sing-Along, Play-Along is an album by Shari Lewis released on September 22, 1992.  It was released on home video in 1988 by Fries Home Video. Songs were written by Norman Martin copyright ©1988 and produced by Glenn Jordan.  All songs were published by Norman Martin Music (BMI) except "The Soft and Loud Song" and "Haunted House" which are published by Norman Martin Music (BMI)/Kadockadee Music (ASCAP).  The children's choir director was Ann Pittel.

Songs

Credits
 Co-producers: Norman Martin and Shari Lewis
 Original Songs: Norman Martin
 Creative Consultant: Rick Hauser
 Music Produced & Arranged by: Glenn Jordan
 Production Facility: Tim & Jean Johnson CSI Video Center
 Director Of Photography: Lloyd Freidus
 Line Producer: Ralph Davis
 Master Puppeteer: Pat Brymer
 Assistant To Pat Brymer: Lauren Lavien
 Production Associate: Amy Von Ronnebeck
 Prop Master: Todd Tillson
 Production Assistants: Mitch Glanzbergh and Suzanne Weisberg
 Still Photography: Paul Drinkwater
 Assistant To Shari Lewis: Holly Claman
 Wardrobe Mistress: Georgia Anderson
 Children's Movement Coordinator: Bonnie Martin
 Cast: Shari Lewis, Aaron Brownstein, Hannah Hauser, Noah Hauser, Christopher Hooks, Michelle Lee, Chloe Martin, Joshua Martin
 Children's Costumes Provided by: Esprit, Inc.
 Gifts From Lamb Chop's Friends by: Dayton-Hudson Department Stores
 Electrician: John Luker II
 Camera: Bruce Burnside
 Music Engineered by: Larold Rebhun
 Sound: Don Skinner
 Production Assistants: Christine Allen, Bruce Infante, Kathy Quill
 Grips: Vern Nobles Jr., Rick Kelly, Jean Johnson, Brett Drouet
 Computer Animation: E.P. Graphics
 Editing: John Smith, C&C Visual and Gary Brasher, California Video Center 
 Vidifont Operator: Nancy Fenton
 Greens & Flowers: Bob Garren
 Special Thanks To: The Porteus Family
 © 1988 Shari Lewis Enterprises, Inc. 
 Norman Martin Enterprises, Inc.
 Fries Home Video
 A Subsidiary Of Fries Entertainment, Inc.

References

1992 albums
Shari Lewis albums